Bakan is a district in Pursat province, Cambodia. The district capital is at Trapeang Chong located on National Highway 5 around 15 kilometres north of the provincial capital at Pursat town.

According to the 1998 Census, Bakan is made up of 10 communes and 156 villages. The population of the district was 121,229 persons in 22,494 households at the time of the census. Bakan is the most populous district in Pursat province.

Location
Bakan shares a border with Battambang province to the north and the district of Veal Veang to the west. To the south of Bakan are Phnum Kravanh and Sampov Meas districts. Bakan shares its eastern border with Kandieng district. To the northeast Bakan encompasses a portion of the Tonle Sap lake. Three villages in this part of the district are Tonle Sap floating villages. Their location moves depending on the water level in the lake.

Administration 
The following table shows the villages of Bakan district by commune.

Characteristics
The national highway and the only north-south rail link in the country bisect the district and thus most villages have comparatively good access to goods and services. There is a district Hospital at Boeng Khnar  and the provincial capital and higher level services are only a short distance away. There is an active market that spills over onto the highway at Trapeang Chong and this combined with the recent resurfacing of the highway has led to increased traffic accidents and road fatalities.

Wat Bakan

Wat Bakan or Bakan Pagoda is one of the oldest active pagodas in the country. The Buddhist Institute of Cambodia notes that the original pagoda is over 800 years old and has been in continuous use as a temple. It is regarded as one of the holiest sites in Cambodian Buddhism. Parts of the original pagoda can still be seen around a small mound behind one of the buildings of the main temple. During the Khmer Rouge years many stones from the old temple were taken to build an embankment and repair bridges at Damnak Ampil nearby.

References

Districts of Pursat province